Austin Dwayne Trout (born September 18, 1985) is an American professional boxer and bare-knuckle fighter who held the WBA (Regular) light middleweight title from 2011 to 2013. He is also a three-time light middleweight world title challenger; challenging twice for the IBF title in 2016 and 2017, as well as for the WBC title in 2018.

Early life and amateur career
Trout graduated from Mayfield High School in Las Cruces, New Mexico.

In 2004, Austin was the U.S. National Amateur Welterweight Champion.

Austin was the runner-up to make the 2004 U.S. Olympic Boxing Team. He would finish his amateur career with a final record of 163–42–1.

Professional career

Early career
On September 1, 2005, Trout made his professional boxing debut at the age of 19 at the Isleta Casino & Resort in Albuquerque, New Mexico. He defeated 34 year old journeyman Justo Almazan (14-44-5, 1 KO) via TKO in round 3. The fight was scheduled for 4 rounds. His second fight was against Josh Pankey, who was making his debut, in December. Trout made easy work of Pankey stopping him after 1 minute and 45 seconds of round 1.

Trout fought a further five times in 2006, winning all bouts inside the distance. In January 2007, Trout knocked out 30 year old Raul Munoz (19-9-1, 15 KOs) in the fifth round of their scheduled six round fight. Three months later, Trout was taken the six round distance when he defeated Mexican boxer Julio Perez with scores of (60-54, 60-54 and 59–55). Less than a month later, Trout was taken the six round distance again, this time against 33 year old journeyman Abdias Castillo. He won the fight comfortably on all three scorecards (60-54, 60-54 and 60–54). Trout fought and won 3 more times in 2007. By the end of the year, his record read 13 wins, 10 inside the distance and no losses.

In November 2009, he beat Taronze Washington to win the vacant WBC Continental Americas light middleweight title.

By climbing up the ranks, he became a mandatory challenger for the WBA light middleweight title. While waiting for his opportunity to fight for Miguel Cotto for the championship title, Austin ended up working with DeAngelo Singleton to help with early stages of PR. Eventually, Trout would fight for and win a world title.

WBA (Regular) light middleweight champion
Trout fought for his first world title, the WBA (Regular) light middleweight title against Interim champion Rigoberto Álvarez, brother of Canelo Álvarez. The fight was scheduled to take place on February 5, 2011, at the Arena Coliseo in Guadalajara, Jalisco, Mexico. Álvarez was on a three-fight win streak coming into the bout. Trout proved to be the superior boxer of the two winning a lop-sided unanimous decision (119-108, 119–108, 119–108). Trout lost one round on each of the three cards.

Early defences 
In April 2011, soon after winning the title, Trout's first defence was announced to take place against mandatory challenger David Alonso López (42-12, 23 KOs) on June 11 in Mexico. Trout dropped López in round 11 as he went on to successfully retain his WBA "regular" title in a 12-round unanimous decision win with the judges scores of 119–109, 117-110 and 118–109 in his favour. Although López had some success, the majority of the rounds were controlled by Trout using his speed, movement and fast hands. A few days after the fight, it was reported that Trout tested positive for marijuana in the post-fight drug test. López's promoter Hector Garcia called for an immediate rematch. On June 29, the test was overturned and Trout was cleared.

Over the next months, Trout's team tried to make a deal to fight Australian contender Anthony Mundine, however the fight failed to take place. By October, a deal was set for Trout to defend his title against another Australian boxer, former welterweight champion Frank LoPorto (15-4, 7 KOs), who was ranked #14 by the WBA on November 11 at the Cohen Stadium in El Paso, Texas. The fight was carried by Showtime. Trout stopped LoPorto in round 6. In what some believed would be a mismatch, LoPorto was also dropped once in round 1 following a right hook. It was the last time LoPorto fought as a professional at the age of 33.

Trout vs. Rodriguez 
On March 19, 2012, the WBA ordered purse bids for Trout vs. Mundine, who was their Interim champion, to take place at their headquarters on March 29. The purse bids never took place and in April, Trout announced he was close to finalizing a deal with former WBO champion Sergiy Dzinziruk (37-1, 23KOs) on August 25, his biggest fight to date. Days later, it was reported that Trout could instead fight Ring Top 10 Delvin Rodriguez (26-5-3, 14 KOs) on the June 2 at the Home Depot Center in Carson, California. Rodriguez was coming off a 10-round decision win against Pawel Wolak. During this time, Trout signed a deal with boxing advisor Al Haymon. The fight aired on Showtime. Trout dominated the fight, going on to win a one sided unanimous decision. The three judges scored the fight 120–108, 118–110, and 117–111 in favour of Trout. Trout was always in control of the fight and more active than Rodriguez, who only let his hands go in the final round. Over the 12 rounds, Trout landed 151 of 699 punches thrown (22%), this included 41% of his power punches landed and Rodriguez landed 89 of his 440 thrown (20%).

Trout vs. Cotto
On August 31, 2012, terms were agreed for Trout to defend his WBA title against former three division champion and No. 2 ranked light middleweight Miguel Cotto (37-3, 30 KOs) on December 1 at Madison Square Garden in New York City. Cotto was coming off a loss in May 2012 against Floyd Mayweather. 13,096 attended the Garden. Trout started the fight off fast, using his quick combinations to continually get his punches off first against Cotto. Trout also used his superior footwork to evade most of Cotto's punches, and was able to out muscle Cotto off the ropes when he was cornered in the fight. During the middle rounds, Cotto found success trapping Trout on the ropes and keeping him there, ripping Trout with body shots and finding the range with his left hook. Trout regained control in the later rounds, even backing Cotto up later in the fight, and stunned Cotto several times down the stretch with his straight left hand. Trout won the fight by a wide unanimous decision, giving him the biggest win of his career thus far. The judges scores were 117–111, 117–111, 119–109. It was the first time Cotto had lost at the arena, having a record of 7-0 before the fight, also being 9–0 in New York. Trout landed 238 of 779 punches (31%) and Cotto landed 183 of 628 punches thrown (29%). After the fight, Trout called out fellow light middleweight champion Canelo Álvarez. The fight averaged 1.047 million and peaked at 1.4 million viewers, which set a record for Showtime boxing.

Consecutive losses

Trout vs. Álvarez
On April 20, 2013, Trout fought undefeated Canelo Álvarez at the Alamodome in San Antonio. The fight was supposed to take place during Cinco de Mayo weekend as the co-main event of the Floyd Mayweather Jr. bout against Robert Guerrero; however, due to a contract disagreement between Álvarez and Mayweather regarding their potential fight on September 14, 2013, Álvarez opted to headline his own card. Álvarez held a rematch clause in the contract if wanted however Trout did not. Due to the fight taking place in Texas, a moment of silence was held prior to the fight for the victims of the Boston Marathon bombings on April 15 and the victims of the fertilizer plant explosion on April 17 in West, Texas.

In front of 39,247 fans, Álvarez successfully defended his WBC light middleweight title and won the WBA & the vacant The Ring magazine light middleweight title. During the first rounds, Trout seemed to have a good game plan. However, Álvarez's power took over after the third round, eventually scoring a knockdown in the seventh round to give Trout the first knockdown of his career. Álvarez set up the knockdown with a pawing left jab, followed by the straight right hand. The fight was closer than expected, but Álvarez still managed to dominate Trout throughout the fight with impressive head movement and shocking power. All three judges scorecards were in favor of Álvarez with a fair margin (115-112, 116-111 and 118–109). Although the last score card (118-109) created controversy, the majority of sport analysts had Álvarez winning by at least 2 points. After 8 rounds, the judges scorecards read (80-71, 78-73 and 76–75) to Álvarez. CompuBox Stats showed that Trout was the busier fighter landing 154 of 769 punches thrown (20%) and Álvarez was the more accurate puncher landing 124 of his 431 thrown (29%). Immediately after the bout, Trout stated that he hadn't underestimated Álvarez but that he trained to fight a completely different fighter.

Trout vs. Lara
After losing to Álvarez, Trout next fought Cuban boxer Erislandy Lara (18-1-2, 12 KO's) for his WBA Interim light middleweight title. The fight was scheduled to take place on December 7, 2013, at Barclays Center in Brooklyn, New York. It was initially supposed take place on the Floyd Mayweather Jr. vs. Saul Alvarez card on September 14, 2013. Lara, however, put on a dominant performance as he immediately nullified Trout's offense using deft footwork and clean punching. In outclassing Trout, Lara scored a knockdown in round eleven via straight left hand. Trout was hurt for the remainder of the round as Lara pressed the action. Lara cruised to the unanimous decision (117–111, 117–111, and 118–109) and retained his interim WBA light middleweight title. Trout lost his second consecutive bout by decision.

Comeback trail
Following back to back defeats, Trout took time off before returning to the ring starting his comeback trail to regain a world title at light middleweight. His first comeback fight took place in August 2014 against former WBO light middleweight title challenger Daniel Dawson (40-3-1, 26 KOs) in a 10-round bout. Trout was knocked down twice in round 3 via straight right hands, but rallied on and won a unanimous decision in what was supposed to be an easy tune-up. After 10 rounds, the three judges scored it 97-90 for Trout. Trout next fought four months later in December against fringe contender Luis Grajeda (18-3-2, 14 KOs). Grajeda was knocked down once in round five and failed to come out for round 8, giving Trout a stoppage victory.

On May 9, 2015, Trout fought 33 year old Luis Galarza (20-3, 14 KOs) at the State Farm Arena in Hidalgo, Texas. Galarza was a late replacement for former titlist Anthony Mundine, who had picked up an injury before the fight. Galarza took the fight on 3 days notice and was on a three-fight win streak. Trout controlled the fight from the opening bell eventually forced the stoppage after round 6. In September 2015, Trout knocked out Joey Hernandez (24-3-1, 14 KOs) following a body shot in round 6. Hernandez was deducted a point in round 4 after he threw Trout to the canvas.

Title challenges

Trout vs. Jermall Charlo
On March 29, it was announced that Trout would challenge Jermall Charlo (23-0, 18 KOs) for the IBF title at The Cosmopolitan of Las Vegas in Las Vegas, Nevada. The card also included top light middleweights Erislandy Lara, Vanes Martirosyan and Jermell Charlo. At first, there was rumours that the fight would take place on the undercard of Wilder–Povetkin in a Showtime split site telecast. Another possibility, was it could take place on the Ortíz–Berto II undercard. In a close contested bout, Charlo defeated Trout by a 12-round unanimous decision. The judges’ scored the fight 115–113, 116–112, 116–112. Charlo landed the harder shots to dominate the action in the first six rounds. However, Charlo seemed to gas out a little in the second half of the fight, and was outworked by Trout. Trout suffered a cut over his right eye in the 10th round from a clash of heads but fought well despite suffering the cut. The crowd booed loudly when the scores were read out to let the judges know that they felt Trout should have won. Charlo landed 130 of 474 punches thrown (27%) and Trout landed 117 of his 490 thrown (24%). Trout received a purse of $300,000 and Charlo earned a purse of $500,000.

Trout vs. Hurd
On May 31, 2017 The Ring TV announced a deal was in place for Trout to challenge undefeated American boxer Jarrett Hurd (20-0, 14 KOs) for his newly won IBF light middleweight title on July 29 on the undercard of Mikey Garcia vs. Adrien Broner in New York. Hurd won the then vacant title after stopping Tony Harrison in round 9 in February 2017. The title was left vacant by Jermall Charlo, who moved up to middleweight. On July 20, Boxing Scene reported the fight was being lined up to take place on September 30, 2017, as part of a light middleweight double header alongside Jermell Charlo's WBC title defence against Erickson Lubin. Because Hurd was granted an exception from the IBF to make a voluntary defence, however the winner must fight mandatory challenger Cedric Vitu (46-2, 19 KOs) by December 29, 2017. On August 24, Ringtv announced the fight would take place as part of a light middleweight triple-header at the Barclays Center in New York City on October 14, 2017. The third world title fight on the card would feature Erislandy Lara defending his WBA title against Terrell Gausha.

On fight night, Trout started the fight well, winning the early rounds by jabbing and moving. However, during the third round, Hurd seemed to hurt Trout with some power shots. In the middle rounds, Hurd was able to stifle Trout's movement, making the fight more of a brawl, with both fighters trading power shots. Hurd seemed unfazed by Trout's punches, even though he seemed to tire during round 7. On the other hand, Trout was visibly backed up several times by Hurd's shots. Hurd was cut from a head clash during round 7, while Trout's right eye started swelling. Hurd backed up Trout once again towards the end of round 10. Trout's cornermen retired following round 10 to protect their fighter, to the chagrin of the former world champion. The announced attendance was 7,643. For the fight, Hurd earned $330,000, while Trout, who was stopped inside the distance for the first time since turning professional, was paid $225,000. In the action packed fight, Hurd landed 265 of 753 punches (35%) and Trout landed 208 of his 673 thrown (31%).

On January 11, 2018, it was announced that Trout would make a ring return against Colombian boxer Juan De Angel on the Devon Alexander vs. Victor Ortiz undercard on February 17 at the Don Haskins Center on the UTEP campus in El Paso, Texas. Trout won the bout via unanimous decision. All three judges scored the fight a shut-out 80-72 for Trout.

Trout vs. Jermell Charlo 
At a Showtime press conference on January 24, 2018, it was announced that Jermell Charlo (30-0, 15 KOs) would make a third defence of his WBC title on June 9 on the undercard of Santa Cruz vs. Mares II at the Staples Center in Los Angeles. On April 10, it was announced that Trout would challenge Charlo in a fight which would mark Trout's third world title attempt in his last four fights. Charlo retained his title defeating Trout in a close bout. One judge scored the bout 113-113, however the remaining two judges scored the bout 115-111 and 118-108 for Charlo, giving him the majority decision win. Charlo knocked Trout down in rounds 3 and 9. The bout, which was mostly a tactical affair, was not well received by the fans in attendance. They booed during the bout and again during the post fight interview of Charlo. The first knockdown came with a combination of punches finished with a left hook to the head. After the knockdown, Trout began to fight more defensively. A counter left hook dropped Trout a second time. After the fight, Trout said, "Take away the knockdowns, and I won the fight." Charlo  stated his frustrations, "I knew he would come in and try to survive. I could catch him with my hook." According to CompuBox, Charlo landed 106 of 421 punches (25%) and Trout landed 82 of 407 his punches (20%). For his defence, Charlo was paid $750,000 and Trout received a $250,000 paycheck. The fight averaged 532,000 and peaked at 575,000 viewers.

Career from 2019–present

Trout vs. Gausha 
On April 11, 2019, it was reported that Trout would fight 31 year old former world title challenger Terrell Gausha (21-1, 10 KOs) in a 10-round light middleweight bout, headlining at the Beau Rivage Resort Casino in Biloxi, Mississippi on May 25, on Fox Sports 1. Going into the bout, Trout felt a win would potentially earn him another opportunity at a world title. Gausha was coming off a first-round knockout of former Trout opponent Joey Hernandez in December 2018.

In his next fight, Trout fought Rosbel Montoya. Trout made quick work out of his opponent, stopping him in the second round of the fight.

On 6 February 2021, more than a year after his last fight, Trout fought Juan Armando Garcia in Mexico. Trout dominated his opponent throughout the fight, as all three judges scored the fight 99–91 in his favour, awarding him the unanimous decision victory.

Life outside of boxing
Trout appeared on "His Opinion...", an episode of reality TV show Say Yes to the Dress, when his fiancé Taylor chose her wedding dress.

Professional boxing record

Bare-knuckle boxing record

|-
|Win
|align=center|1–0 
|Diego Sanchez
|TKO (doctor stoppage)
|BKFC KnuckleMania 3
|
|align=center|4
|align=center|1:44 
|Albuquerque, New Mexico, United States
|
|-

Filmography

References

Video references

External links

Austin Trout - Profile, News Archive & Current Rankings at Box.Live

African-American boxers
Sportspeople from Las Cruces, New Mexico
Light-middleweight boxers
1985 births
Living people
Boxers from New Mexico
American male boxers
Welterweight boxers
Winners of the United States Championship for amateur boxers
World Boxing Association champions
World light-middleweight boxing champions
21st-century African-American sportspeople
20th-century African-American people